Neutralization may refer to:

 Neutralization (chemistry), a chemical reaction where a base and an acid react to form a salt
 Neutralisation (immunology), pathogen neutralization caused by antibodies
 Neutralisation (sociology)
 Neutralization (linguistics), the elimination of certain distinctive features of phonemes in certain environments
 Insertion of a network in an amplifier to eliminate parasitic oscillation (electronics)

 Neutralize the Threat (2011), title of a music album